The French destroyer Vauban was one of six s (contre-torpilleurs) built for the French Navy during the 1920s.

After France surrendered to Germany in June 1940 during World War II, Vauban served with the navy of Vichy France. She was among the ships of the French fleet scuttled at Toulon, France, on 27 November 1942. Her wreck later was salvaged and scrapped.

Notes

References

 
 

World War II warships scuttled at Toulon
Maritime incidents in November 1942
Guépard-class destroyers
1930 ships
Ships built in France